Robert Havemann (11 March 1910 – 9 April 1982) was an East German chemist and dissident.

Life and career

He studied chemistry in Berlin and Munich from 1929 to 1933, and then later received a doctorate in physical chemistry from the Kaiser Wilhelm Institute.

Havemann joined the Communist Party of Germany (KPD) in 1932 and was one of the founders of the resistance group, European Union. It was in connection with this group that he was arrested by the Gestapo in 1943. He received a death sentence, but his execution was continually postponed because of the intervention of former colleagues, who insisted that Havemann was as important due to his work on chemical weapons and that he was still needed to explain the research. His execution was postponed so many times, he was able to survive until the Brandenburg-Görden Prison was liberated by the Red Army.

After the war, he became head of administration in the Kaiser Wilhelm Institute for Physical Chemistry and Electrochemistry in Berlin, but in 1948 he was dismissed from this position due to political pressure from the American authorities in West Berlin. He continued his scientific work in the institute until he got barred from his laboratory in January 1950. 

He then became a professor of physical chemistry at the Humboldt University of Berlin.  He became a member of the Volkskammer in 1950 and won one of the GDR's national prizes in 1959.

In 1963 he lectured on 'Scientific Aspects of Philosophical Problems' (published as 'Dialectic without Dogmatism—Natural Sciences against Communistic Ideology') and was expelled from the ruling Socialist Unity Party and dismissed from the University—officially because he gave an interview to a newspaper from West Germany.

His son Florian Havemann (born 12 January 1952 in East Berlin) fled to West Germany in 1971.

Havemann was a victim of the Stasi's  psychological warfare program.

He continued his work as a socialist critic and was put under house arrest in 1976, at his home in the village of Grünheide. This continued until his death in 1982, after a long time suffering from lung disease.

In 1989 he was politically rehabilitated by the Socialist Unity Party of Germany.

In 2005, Havemann was awarded the title Righteous among the Nations by the Israeli Holocaust memorial, Yad Vashem.

References

External links
Official website of the award winning film The Burning Wall
Hartmut Jäckel. "Der Dissident der aus der Kälte kam" ("The dissident who came out from the cold") Die Welt (10 March 2010). Retrieved 18 March 2010 
Robert Havemann – his activity to save Jews' lives during the Holocaust, at Yad Vashem website

1910 births
1982 deaths
Scientists from Munich
People from the Kingdom of Bavaria
Communist Party of Germany politicians
Socialist Unity Party of Germany politicians
Members of the Provisional Volkskammer
Members of the 1st Volkskammer
Members of the 2nd Volkskammer
Members of the 3rd Volkskammer
Cultural Association of the GDR members
20th-century German chemists
Colloid chemists
Red Orchestra (espionage)
Communists in the German Resistance
East German dissidents
Members of the German Academy of Sciences at Berlin
German Righteous Among the Nations
Recipients of the National Prize of East Germany
Recipients of the Patriotic Order of Merit in silver
Max Planck Institute directors